The 2019–20 Alabama A&M Bulldogs basketball team represented Alabama A&M University in the 2019–20 NCAA Division I men's basketball season. The Bulldogs, led by second-year head coach Dylan Howard, played their home games at the Elmore Gymnasium in Normal, Alabama as members of the Southwestern Athletic Conference. They finished the season 8–22, 5–13 in SWAC play to finish in eighth place. They lost in the quarterfinals of the SWAC tournament to Prairie View A&M.

Previous season
The Bulldogs finished the 2018–19 season 5–27 overall, 4–14 in SWAC play, to finish in a tie for 9th place. For the second season in a row, Alabama A&M was ineligible for postseason play due to APR violations, preventing them from participating in the SWAC tournament.

Roster

Schedule and results

|-
!colspan=12 style=| Non-conference regular season

|-
!colspan=9 style=| SWAC regular season

|-
!colspan=12 style=| SWAC tournament
|-

|-

Source

References

Alabama A&M Bulldogs basketball seasons
Alabama AandM Bulldogs
Alabama AandM Bulldogs basketball
Alabama AandM Bulldogs basketball